Guglielmo Enrico Lardelli (12 May 1857 – 7 July 1910) was an Italian Australian who migrated from Britain as a teenager and composed hundreds of works. He is best remembered for baroque styled Toccatina and modern works Dolce Plainte (Sweet Complaint).  Lardelli's Russian Love Song has been revived at the BBC proms.

Works
 1890 Annette gavotte
 1913 Nocturne in G flat
 Mina Valse
 Toccatina 
 Sailing Polka 
 Magnificat and Nunc Dimittis
 Beside The Sea
 Sardonyx polka
 Mazurka caprice

References

1857 births
1910 deaths
Australian male composers
Australian composers
Australian songwriters